This was the first edition of the tournament. The tournament was canceled prior to completion due to the coronavirus pandemic.

Seeds
The top two seeds received a bye into the quarterfinals.

Draw

References

External links
 Main draw

2020 ATP Challenger Tour
Sports events curtailed due to the COVID-19 pandemic